The Arbëreshë cuisine is the cuisine of the Arbëreshë people in Italy. It has been significantly influenced by Albanian and Italian cuisine.

See also   
 Albanian cuisine
 Italian cuisine 
 Arbëreshë people
 Tumacë me tulë

References 

 

Albanian cuisine
Italian cuisine
Arbëreshë culture